= Buy Then Build =

2018 finance book by Walker Deibel

- Author: Walker Deibel
- Audio read by: Roger Wayne
- Language: English
- Subject: Finance
- Publisher: Lioncrest Publishing
- Publication date: October 20, 2018
- Publication place: United States
- Media type: Print (hard & paperback), e-book, audiobook
- Pages: 312 pages
- Awards: Amazon Best Seller: No. 1 in Valuation (Books) No. 1 in Consolidation & Merger Wall Street Journal Best Seller USA Today Best Seller
- ISBN: 978-1-544-53566-1

Buy Then Build: How Acquisition Entrepreneurs Outsmart the Startup Game is a 2018 finance book by Walker Deibel. The book serves as a guide for prospective business buyers, emphasizing the advantages of acquiring existing businesses over starting one from scratch.

Buy Then Build challenges the idea that entrepreneurship means starting from scratch. The author stresses building trust with sellers, creating solid business plans, and managing the emotional side of acquisitions and transitions.

== Summary ==
Buy Then Build revolves around the premise that an established business will have a significant advantage. By buying them out, you eliminate that competitive threat and instantly become the market leader. Deibel starts his book advising that “the startup phase is a company killer” and proposes "a path that could bypass the startup phase altogether.” The book is divided into four parts, Opportunity, Evaluation, Analysis, and Execution, explaining how to go about finding a company to buy, negotiating the deal, purchasing the business, and transitioning ownership. Deibel uses his own experiences co-founding seven businesses, supplemented by research and interviews, to present a case for his entrepreneurial method.

On the tactical side, this book goes through the specifics of how to pinpoint an ideal company by identifying an “opportunity profile” and creating a “target statement.” In the section on analyzing a potential acquisition, he walks readers through the basics of analyzing financial statements, evaluating a business, and valuing a company. The book also delves into the neurological side of things, talking about the mindset of the seller. Deibel provides several techniques for the buyer to engage in non-threatening and meaningful conversations with the seller.
